Hossein Shah-Hosseini was an Iranian politician who served as the head of the Physical Education Organization, as well as the National Olympic Committee during the interim cabinet of Mehdi Bazargan.

A leading member of the National Front, he belonged to its Islamic-oriented faction and was closely associated with the Council of Nationalist-Religious Activists of Iran. Shah-Hosseini also served as the treasurer of National Council for Peace.

References

External link

1928 births
2017 deaths
Heads of Physical Education Organization
Iranian religious-nationalists
National Front (Iran) politicians
Members of the Association for Defense of Freedom and the Sovereignty of the Iranian Nation
Members of the National Council for Peace
People from Nur, Iran